David Emanuel Twiggs (February 14, 1790 – July 15, 1862), born in Georgia, was a career army officer, serving during the War of 1812, the Black Hawk War, and Mexican–American War.

As commander of the U.S. Army's Department of Texas when the American Civil War broke out, he surrendered his entire command to Confederate commissioners, with facilities, armaments, and other supplies valued at $1.6 million. Dismissed from the U.S. Army as a traitor, he was commissioned as a general of the Confederate States Army in 1861. But, recognizing he was in poor health, he quickly resigned from his commission that year. He was the oldest Confederate general to serve in the Civil War.

Early life
Twiggs was born in 1790 on the "Good Hope" plantation in Richmond County, Georgia, son of John Twiggs and his wife, Ruth Emanuel. A general in the Georgia militia during the American Revolutionary War, the senior Twiggs was the namesake for Twiggs County, Georgia. He was the nephew, through his mother, of David Emanuel, Governor of Georgia.

Early military career
Twiggs volunteered for service as a captain during the War of 1812 and made a career in the military.

In 1816, Twiggs was ordered by Major General Edmund P. Gaines to set out from Fort Montgomery and establish a new fort on the border of the Alabama Territory and Spanish West Florida. This new fort was known as Fort Crawford. After serving at Fort Crawford, Twiggs became commandant of Fort Scott.

In 1828, he was sent to Wisconsin to establish a fort at the portage between the Fox and Wisconsin rivers. With three companies of the First Infantry, his forces built Fort Winnebago around what has come to be known as Fort Winnebago Surgeon's Quarters at Portage, Wisconsin. This was a base of operation during the Black Hawk War.

Twiggs was commissioned as Colonel of the 2nd U.S. Dragoons in 1836 and served in the Seminole Wars in Florida, where he earned the nickname "Bengal Tiger" for his fierce temper. He also decided to act offensively against the Seminole rather than wait for them to strike first. Some of the Seminole moved deep into the Everglades, evading U.S. forces. They never surrendered, and the U.S. government finally gave up on hopes of removing them to Indian Territory.

Mexican–American War
During the Mexican–American War (1846–1848), Twiggs led a brigade in the Army of Occupation at the battles of Palo Alto and Resaca de la Palma. He was promoted to brigadier general in 1846 and commanded a division at the Battle of Monterrey. He joined Winfield Scott's expedition, commanding its 2nd Division of Regulars. He led the division in all the battles from Veracruz through Mexico City. He was wounded during the assault on Chapultepec. After the fall of Mexico City, he was appointed military governor of Veracruz. Brigadier General Twiggs was awarded a ceremonial sword by the Congress on March 2, 1849. He was an original member of the Aztec Club of 1847, a military society of officers who had served in the Mexican War.

Commander of the Department of Texas
After the Mexican–American War, Twiggs was appointed brevet major general and commanded the U.S. Army's Department of Texas. He was in this command when the American Civil War broke out. He was one of four general officers of the line in the U.S. Army in 1861, along with Winfield Scott, John Wool, and William Harney. As there was then no mandatory retirement, all four men were over the age of 60, with three having served in the War of 1812 half a century earlier.

Twiggs's command included about 20% of the U.S. Army guarding the Mexican border. As states began to declare secession, he met with a trio of Confederate commissioners, including Philip N. Luckett and Samuel A. Maverick. Twiggs surrendered his entire command — all the federal installations, property, and soldiers in Texas — to the Confederacy. This included 20 military installations (including the U.S. Arsenal at the Alamo), 44 cannons, 400 pistols, 1,900 muskets, 500 wagons, and 950 horses, valued at $1.6 million. He insisted that all U.S. soldiers be allowed to retain personal arms and sidearms, all artillery (?), and flags and standards. Shortly after the declared secession of South Carolina in December 1860, Twiggs wrote a letter to Scott that proclaimed that Georgia was his home and that Twiggs would follow the state if it declared secession from the United States.

Confederate service
Twiggs was dismissed from the U.S. Army on March 1, 1861, for "treachery to the flag of his country." He accepted a commission as a major general from the Confederate States Army on May 22, 1861. He was assigned to command the Confederate Department of Louisiana (comprising that state along with the southern half of Mississippi and Alabama), but he was past the age of 70 and in poor health. He resigned from his commission before he could assume any active duty. Mansfield Lovell succeeded him in the command of New Orleans. Twiggs retired on October 11, 1861.

Death and burial
Twiggs died of pneumonia in Augusta, Georgia on July 15, 1862. He is buried in Twiggs Cemetery, also known as the Family Burying Ground, on Good Hope Plantation in Richmond County, Georgia.

See also

 List of American Civil War generals (Confederate)

Notes

References
 Eicher, John H., and David J. Eicher, Civil War High Commands. Stanford: Stanford University Press, 2001. .
 New York Times, March 4, 1861
 Silkenat, David. Raising the White Flag: How Surrender Defined the American Civil War. Chapel Hill: University of North Carolina Press, 2019. .
 Sifakis, Stewart. Who Was Who in the Civil War. New York: Facts On File, 1988. .
 Warner, Ezra J. Generals in Gray: Lives of the Confederate Commanders. Baton Rouge: Louisiana State University Press, 1959. .
 Winters, John D. The Civil War in Louisiana. Baton Rouge: Louisiana State University Press, 1963. .

External links
 
 Reenactment of Twiggs's Surrender in San Antonio
 David Emanuel Twiggs in A Continent Divided: The U.S.-Mexico War, Center for Greater Southwestern Studies, the University of Texas at Arlington

1790 births
1862 deaths
People from Richmond County, Georgia
United States Army generals
American military personnel of the Mexican–American War
Members of the Aztec Club of 1847
United States Army personnel of the War of 1812
Confederate States Army major generals
People of Texas in the American Civil War
People of Georgia (U.S. state) in the American Civil War
Jewish Confederates
People of the Creek War